The Università per Stranieri di Siena is a university in Siena, in Tuscany in central Italy. It is one of the two Italian universities oriented towards study by foreign students (the other is the Università per Stranieri di Perugia in Perugia, in Umbria, established in 1921.

Universities in Tuscany
Education in Siena
Buildings and structures in Siena
1917 establishments in Italy
Educational institutions established in 1917